Walter Frost (21 March 1873 – 1955) was an English footballer who played as a winger.

References

1873 births
1955 deaths
Sportspeople from Suffolk
English footballers
Association football wingers
Middlesbrough F.C. players
South Bank F.C. players
Grimsby Town F.C. players
English Football League players